Rhythm'A'Ning (released 1986 in Oslo, Norway by Cadence Jazz Records - CJR 1030) is a live album (LP) by the Norwegian guitarist Thorgeir Stubo Quintet.

Critical reception 
This live album recorded in Tromsø, is perhaps the strongest and most consistent of all of Thorgeir Stubø releases. The band works well together, and exercises uncompromising and very hard-swinging bop of high international standing. Saxophonist Krister Andersson stands well in this repertoire, with his harsh tone and highly Coltraneinspirerte performance on this release definitely keep very high international standard. Pianist Lars Sjösten have some minimalist style, where the most improvisations largely based on the design development and this is a nice contrast to Stubø's and Andersson's more hectic play.

Allmusic awarded the album 4.5 stars.

Track listing
A side
«Rhythm-A-Ning» (9:39)(Thelonious Monk)
«Swingin' till the Girls Come Home» (9:19) (Oscar Pettiford)
«In a Sentimental Mood» (8:44) (Duke Ellington)

B side
«I Love You» (10:25)(Cole Porter)
«Moments Notice» (7:58) (John Coltrane)
«Hot House» (9:09) (Tadd Dameron)

Personnel
Thorgeir Stubø - guitar
Krister Andersson - tenor saxophone
Lars Sjösten - piano
Terje Venaas - double bass
Egil "Bop" Johansen - drums

References

Thorgeir Stubø albums
1986 live albums